Patero may refer to:

 Patero, Greece, a village in Fortosi, Greece
 Joseph D. Patero (1932–2020), American politician

See also 
 Pateros (disambiguation)